Apollo is an extinct town in Putnam County, in the U.S. state of Georgia.

History
The community was named after Apollo, the Greek and Roman god of music, healing, light, prophecy and enlightenment. The community still appeared on maps as late as 1955.

References

Geography of Putnam County, Georgia
Ghost towns in Georgia (U.S. state)